Fritz Schaumburg (30 December 1905 – 19 December 1988) was a German middle-distance runner. He competed in the men's 1500 metres at the 1936 Summer Olympics.

References

1905 births
1988 deaths
Athletes (track and field) at the 1936 Summer Olympics
German male middle-distance runners
Olympic athletes of Germany
Place of birth missing